Horaga onyx, the common onyx, is a species of lycaenid or blue butterfly found in Asia.

Range
The butterfly is mostly seen in India (Western Ghats, Maharashtra southwards, Himachal Pradesh to Arunachal Pradesh) and also in Nepal, Bhutan, Bangladesh, Myanmar and Sri Lanka.

Status
Locally common.

Larvae food plants
Coriaria nepalensis (Coriariaceae).

Mangifera indica

Description

The butterfly has a wingspan of 27 to 33 mm. Upperside: for both sexes, blue with broad black apex, termen and costa. Underside: the butterfly has dark yellowish or greenish brown with irregular and variable broad white discal band across their wings. Underside forewing: the male has a well defined brand along basal half of vein 1. Underside hindwing: well defined white band.

Habit and habitat
Found on thick hilly forests, never found on plains. Their flight is weak, prefers not to come out in the open, but does bask on leaves. In the north it flies up to 2,000 m on the hills when it is on the wing from March to May and in September to October.

See also
List of butterflies of India
List of butterflies of India (Lycaenidae)

Cited references

References
 
 
 
 

onyx
Fauna of Pakistan
Insects of India
Insects of Bangladesh
Insects of Myanmar
Butterflies of Sri Lanka
Fauna of Nepal
Fauna of Bhutan
Butterflies described in 1857